Tahir Güleç (born 25 February 1993) is a German taekwondo athlete of Turkish descent. He represented Germany at the 2016 Summer Olympics in Rio de Janeiro, in the men's 80 kg. He finished in 7th place after losing to Piotr Paziński of Poland in the repechage.

References

1993 births
Living people
German male taekwondo practitioners
Olympic taekwondo practitioners of Germany
Taekwondo practitioners at the 2016 Summer Olympics
Taekwondo practitioners at the 2015 European Games
Taekwondo practitioners at the 2010 Summer Youth Olympics
World Taekwondo Championships medalists
21st-century German people